The Benelli Kite is a single shot .177 inch calibre pre-charged pneumatic air pistol designed for the 10 m Air Pistol ISSF shooting event. It is manufactured by Benelli Armi SpA of Italy.

The Kite was used by Francesco Bruno to win a gold medal in the Italian Championship 2008. It is also used by Tanyu Kiryakov, who won gold in the 10 m Air Pistol at the Olympic Games in Seoul 1988.

Design details
Like all air pistols designed for the 10 m Air Pistol event, it has fully adjustable sights, a mechanically adjustable trigger (for stroke and weight of 1st and 2nd phase and trigger stop) and an anatomically adjustable grip available in three sizes and for left and right-handed shooters. The model pictured here is fitted with a stabilising balance weight, designed to further improve stability of the pistol during firing and to minimize recoil.

The barrel is manufactured by Lothar Walther with 12-twist right-hand rifling and 450 mm pitch. Air power is supplied from an under-barrel cylinder, available in four different capacities: long (300 shots), intermediate (230 shots), medium (180 shots) and short (80 shots). A pressure gauge on the end of the cylinder allows for constant monitoring of the pressure.

The Benelli Kite features micrometric rear sight adjustment with four settings:

1 click = 1 mm windage (left/right adjustment) at 10 metres.
1 click = 2 mm elevation (up/down adjustment) at 10 metres.

The sight aperture is adjustable by lever and screw.

Performance
The following tables show the results achieved by competitive shooters using the Benelli Kite in major competitions:

Gold medals

Silver medals

Bronze medals

Picture gallery

See also
 Benelli Kite Young - smaller version of the Kite, for junior competitors.
 Benelli Armi SpA
 10 metre Air Pistol
 ISSF shooting events

References

Air pistols